Michel Kaltack (born 12 November 1990) in Vanuatu is a Vanuatuan footballer who plays as a midfielder for Erakor Golden Star and the Vanuatu national football team.

Career 
He played for Erakor Golden Star and for Tafea F.C. in the Vanuatu Premia Divisen, before signed with in the early of 2012 with Papua New Guinean top club PRK Hekari United. After a half year with Hekari, returned to Vanuatu and signed for his former club Erakor Golden Star, which presented currently as Captain.

International 
He is also part of the Vanuatu national football team.

References

1990 births
Living people
Vanuatuan footballers
Vanuatu international footballers
Tafea F.C. players
Association football midfielders
Erakor Golden Star F.C. players
2012 OFC Nations Cup players
Vanuatu under-20 international footballers